The River Drish is a river  in Ireland. It is a tributary of River Suir, which it joins at Turtulla, just over 1½ km (about 1 mile) southeast of the town of Thurles.

See also
Rivers of Ireland

Rivers of County Tipperary